Riendeau is a surname. Notable people with the surname include:

Michel Riendeau (born 1955), Canadian Olympic rowing coxswain
Richard Riendeau (1932–2015), American football player and coach
Vincent Riendeau (born 1966), Canadian ice hockey player
Vincent Riendeau (diver) (born 1996), Canadian Olympic diver
Yannick Riendeau (born 1988), Canadian ice hockey player